Pleasant View is a census-designated place, unincorporated community and coal town in Whitley County, Kentucky, United States. Their post office closed in 1965.

Demographics

References

Census-designated places in Whitley County, Kentucky
Unincorporated communities in Kentucky
Coal towns in Kentucky
Census-designated places in Kentucky